Two Highways is an album by American violinist/singer Alison Krauss, which was released in 1989. It is the first album where Krauss is accompanied by her group, Union Station. It was nominated for a Grammy Award for Best Bluegrass Album in 1990.

Track listing
 "Two Highways" (Larry Cordle) – 3:31
 "I'm Alone Again" (Todd Rakestraw) – 2:53
 "Wild Bill Jones" (Traditional) – 3:20
 "Beaumont Rag" (Traditional) – 2:27
 "Heaven's Bright Shore" (A. Kennedy) – 3:01
 "Love You In Vain" (John Pennell) – 2:18
 "Here Comes Goodbye" (John Pennell) – 3:47
 "As Lovely As You" (John Pennell) – 3:56
 "Windy City Rag" (Kenny Baker) – 2:25
 "Lord Don't Forsake Me" (Todd Rakestraw) – 4:02
 "Teardrops Will Kiss the Morning Dew" (Paul Craft) – 3:38
 "Midnight Rider" (Gregg Allman, Robert Payne) – 2:47

Personnel
 Alison Krauss – fiddle, vocals
 Jeff White – guitar, vocals
 Mike Harman – banjo, vocals
 John Pennell – bass

with
 Jerry Douglas – dobro
 Brent Truitt – mandolin

References

1989 albums
Alison Krauss & Union Station albums
Rounder Records albums